"Blood on the Dance Floor" is a song by American singer-songwriter Michael Jackson, released as the first single from the remix album Blood on the Dance Floor: HIStory in the Mix (1997). Jackson and Teddy Riley created the track in time for the 1991 release of Dangerous. However, it did not appear on that record and was worked on further for its commercial release in 1997. One interpretation of the song describes a predatory woman named Susie who seduces Jackson before plotting to stab him with a knife. The composition explores a variety of genres ranging from funk to new jack swing.

The single peaked at number 42 on the US Billboard Hot 100 and reached number one in Denmark, New Zealand, Spain and the United Kingdom. It also reached the top 10 several other countries, including Australia, Finland, Germany, Netherlands, Norway and Sweden. Commentators compared "Blood on the Dance Floor" to music from Dangerous. Others commented on the song's perceived aggressive tone and the vocal style, the broad genres heard and possible lyrical interpretations of the song. Reviews at the time of release were largely mixed, but contemporary reviews have been favorable. The song was promoted with a music video that premiered on Top of the Pops. It centered on Susie seducing Jackson in a courtship "dance", before opening a switchblade. "Blood on the Dance Floor" was the only track from the remix album performed on the HIStory World Tour.

Production and music
Teddy Riley came up with the song's title while Jackson recorded the piece for his Dangerous album in 1991—it failed to make the final track listing. Riley was reportedly upset that Jackson did not call him to "vacuum clean this old master" upon realizing it would be included on Blood on the Dance Floor: HIStory in the Mix. Riley wanted to update the musical composition before it appeared on the remix album. In a Making Michael interview, Matt Forger mentioned that the original Teddy Riley DAT version (which Teddy Riley played to Jackson when he came to work on "Dangerous") to Montreux where Jackson cut his vocals when work began on the album. Also, Brad Buxer added more instrumentation to the track during the sessions.
 
Instruments played in the song include a guitar and piano, the latter of which has an F2–E5 range in scientific pitch notation. Jackson's vocal range on the track is C3–B5 and aspects of the song are performed in the key F minor. Genres that have been attributed to the song are dance, funk and new jack swing. Jackson incorporates many of the vocal traits associated with his work, such as hiccups and gasps. Neil Strauss of The New York Times suggests that the predatory woman in the title track, "Susie", is a metaphor for AIDS. However, in an interview with Adrian Grant, Jackson denied that the song was about AIDS.

Included throughout releases of the single are three remixes of the song "Dangerous" from Jackson's album of the same name. "Dangerous" was originally intended to be the tenth single from that album, and Roger Sanchez, who previously remixed "Jam" and "Don't Stop 'Til You Get Enough", was once again commissioned to create several remixes of the song in time for its release as a single in early 1994. However, the single was cancelled, and all of the remixes were shelved. It is likely that the reason some of these remixes were released as part of this single is due to its association with the Dangerous album, since it was originally created during its recording sessions. Regardless, the majority of Sanchez' original remixes remain unreleased, and are only available on a rare digital audio tape distributed among label executives.

Reception
Larry Flick from Billboard wrote, "Produced by the artist with Teddy Riley this track chugs with a pleasant jeep-styled groove that provides a firm foundation for a lip-smacking vocal and a harmony-laden hook that is downright unshakable." He added that it is a "winning jam". The Dallas Morning News described "Blood on the Dance Floor" as an angry tale of a back-stabbing woman and Michael Saunders of The Boston Globe described it as "a middling dance-funk cut". Anthony Violenti of The Buffalo News said of the single, "[it is] laced with Teddy Riley's new jack swing sound and a pounding techno beat", whereas The Cincinnati Post characterized the song as a "lackluster first release ... dated, played-out dance track", but gave the album an overall favorable review. Jim Farber of New York Daily News, noted of the vocals and musical style, "[Jackson] coughs up a series of strangulated mutters and munchkin hiccups in lieu of a vocal, while its chilly, faux-industrial music proves as appealing as a migraine". David Sinclair from The Times constated, "With his voice little more than a whisper, and the groove screwed to a very high torque, this is as lean and urgent a piece as Jackson has ever produced."

William Ruhlman of AllMusic observed, "'Blood on the Dance Floor' is an uptempo Jackson song in the increasingly hysterical tradition of 'Billie Jean' and 'Smooth Criminal' with Jackson huffing, puffing, and yelping through some nonsense about a stabbing ... over a fairly generic electronic dance track". He was not complimentary of the B-sides that accompanied it. Stephen Thomas Erlewine, also of AllMusic, had a negative reaction to the record. He described "Blood on the Dance Floor" as a "bleak reworking of 'Jam' and 'Scream'".

Music commentator Nelson George, compared the song to material from Dangerous, such as the critically acclaimed tracks "Jam" and "Dangerous". He described it as a "pile driving" song that "explodes from radio speakers". A longtime commentator on Jackson's public life, J. Randy Taraborrelli, gave a retrospective analysis of the album in the biography, The Magic & the Madness. Taraborrelli thought that "Blood on the Dance Floor" was one of Jackson's best songs, a song that US fans "don't even know exists". In 2005, J T Griffith, of AllMusic, believed that in hindsight, "Blood on the Dance Floor" was actually a good song. He explained, "[it is] a second-rate mixture of 'Beat It' and 'Thriller' but Jackson's missteps are better than most pop music out there. This track showcases all the artist's trademarks: the ooohing, the grunts, and funky basslines. It is hard to hear 'Blood on the Dance Floor' and not want to moonwalk or dance like a ghoul".

Promotion

"Blood on the Dance Floor" was the only track from Blood on the Dance Floor: History in the Mix to appear on the set list of the HIStory World Tour. The music video for "Blood on the Dance Floor" was directed by Jackson and Vincent Paterson. Filming occurred in February 1997, when Jackson's first child Prince was born. It premiered on Top of the Pops in the UK on March 28, 1997, several weeks ahead of its release as a single. The video opens with a thrown switchblade impaling a spray painted image. The impaled image is that of a blood dripping love heart with "SUSIE + ME" scrawled across it. Jackson and a group of dancers then enter a salsa dance hall and he begins to dance with a woman, "Susie", while shaking a piece of percussion. Jackson then appears seated while the woman dances seductively above him on a table top.

After the 1st verse and chorus, there is an a cappella moment, in which Jackson breathes to the drums and the bass, then the strings, then spins, drops down and claps, then the main song starts with the 2nd verse.

Throughout the video, Jackson shows a sexual attraction towards the dancing woman—played by Sybil Azur. Jackson caresses her ankle, calf, knee and thigh, and at one stage looks up her dress. The woman is then seen opening a flick knife as the pair engage in a final courtship dance. The video closes in the same manner it began, with the switchblade impaling the spray painted image. The music video won the Brazilian TVZ Video Award: Best International Music Video of the Year. Interviewed on her experience during the video one of the dancers, Carmit Bachar (of The Pussycat Dolls) noted, "I was called in by Vincent Paterson for 'Blood on the Dance Floor'. It was to have a Latin feel, some sort of mambo. I arrived wearing a little salsa dress, fish nets, heels, and my hair was up in a kind of bun with a flower. I was 'camera ready'. I showed up with the whole outfit. It's not that producers can't see what they like, or the potential in somebody, but what I do helps them to see their vision more".

A "Refugee Camp Mix" of "Blood on the Dance Floor" appeared on Jackson's video collection, HIStory on Film, Volume II and Michael Jackson's Vision. The original song would later appear on the Number Ones DVD, which contained previously unreleased  scenes. Furthermore, Paterson recorded an unreleased, alternate version of the music video, shot with an 8 mm camera. Writer David Noh, described it as, "grainy, overexposed, and sexy as shit". According to Paterson, "Michael loved it, but Sony hated it and refused to release it". The New York Times described the United States promotional effort for the Blood on the Dance Floor: HIStory in the Mix campaign as "subdued", creating "hardly a sound" and "perplexing to many people in the industry". Jackson's label Epic Records, refuted allegations they were not promoting the album sufficiently, saying, "We are completely behind the album ... Michael is certainly one of our superstars and is treated as such ... We just went into this one with our global hats on". The New York Times acknowledged that promotion was stronger internationally, where Jackson had more commercial force and popularity.

Live performances
Jackson performed the song only in the second leg of his HIStory World Tour in 1997.

Chart performance
"Blood on the Dance Floor" became a top ten hit in almost all countries in Europe. It peaked at number one in the UK, Denmark, Spain and New Zealand, charting for 11 weeks in the latter two nations. In the UK it sold 83,767 copies in its first week, enough to take the number one spot from "I Believe I Can Fly" by Jackson collaborator R. Kelly. It was Jackson's seventh and final UK chart topper as a solo artist, although it fell to number eight in its second week of release. The European country where "Blood on the Dance Floor" had the most longevity was Switzerland, where it spent 18 weeks in the chart. The total number of sales in the UK, as of May 2016, stands at 207,700.

"Blood on the Dancefloor" peaked at number 42 on the US Billboard Hot 100. This relatively lower peak position has been attributed to the lack of US promotion and—according to J. Randy Taraborrelli and AllMusic writer William Ruhlman—the ongoing US public interest in Jackon's private life over his music.

Track listings
 UK CD single
 "Blood on the Dance Floor" – 4:13
 "Blood on the Dance Floor (TM's Switchblade Mix)" – 8:38
 "Blood on the Dance Floor (Refugee Camp Mix)" – 5:26
 "Blood on the Dance Floor (Fire Island Vocal Mix)" – 8:55
 "Blood on the Dance Floor (Fire Island Dub)" – 8:55

 US CD single
 "Blood on the Dance Floor" – 4:13
 "Blood on the Dance Floor (TM's Switchblade Edit)" – 3:22
 "Blood on the Dance Floor (Refugee Camp Edit)" – 3:20
 "Dangerous (Roger's Dangerous Edit)" – 4:41

 Europe 12-inch single
 "Blood on the Dance Floor (TM's O-Positive Dub)" – 8:38
 "Blood on the Dance Floor (Fire Island Dub)" – 8:55
 "Dangerous (Roger's Dangerous Club Mix)" – 6:58
 "Dangerous (Roger's Rough Dub)" – 6:48

Remixes
Tony Moran Mixes
 "Blood on the Dance Floor (TM's Switchblade Mix)" – 8:38 / 8:53*
 "Blood on the Dance Floor (TM's Switchblade Edit)" – 3:22
 "Blood on the Dance Floor (TM's O-Positive Dub)" – 8:38
 "Blood on the Dance Floor (T&G Pool of Blood Dub)" – 7:34

Fire Island Mixes
 "Blood on the Dance Floor (Fire Island Vocal Mix)" – 8:55
 "Blood on the Dance Floor (Fire Island Radio Edit)" – 3:50	
 "Blood on the Dance Floor (Fire Island Dub)" – 8:55

Wyclef Jean Mixes
 "Blood on the Dance Floor (Refugee Camp Mix)" – 5:26
 "Blood on the Dance Floor (Refugee Camp Edit)" – 3:20
 "Blood on the Dance Floor (Refugee Camp Dub)" – 3:38

Note: There is an alternate, extended version of Tony Moran's "Switchblade Mix", available only on a singular UK 12-inch promo. The main difference in this version is the inclusion of a new lyrical section at the 2:34 point, which was omitted in the original. The last sound effect at the end of the song is also remarkably different.

Personnel
 Written, composed and produced by Michael Jackson and Teddy Riley
 Solo and background vocals, vocal arrangement by Michael Jackson
 Teddy Riley and Brad Buxer: Keyboards and synthesizers, drum programming
 Guitar by Nile Rodgers
 Matt Carpenter: Digital Systems programming
 Engineered by Teddy Riley, Dave Way and Mick Guzauski
 Mixed by Mick Guzauski

Charts and certifications

Weekly charts

Year-end charts

Certifications

See also
 "Blood on the Dance Floor x Dangerous", a 2017 mashup

References

George, Nelson (2004). Michael Jackson: The Ultimate Collection booklet. Sony BMG.

1997 songs
1997 singles
Epic Records singles
Michael Jackson songs
Funk songs
New jack swing songs
Number-one singles in Denmark
Number-one singles in New Zealand
Number-one singles in Spain
Song recordings produced by Michael Jackson
Song recordings produced by Teddy Riley
Songs written by Michael Jackson
Songs written by Teddy Riley
UK Singles Chart number-one singles